Haruo Ochi   (born 7 February 1984) is a Japanese mixed martial artist, who has been professionally competing since 2008. He is the former DEEP Strawweight Champion. According to Fight Matrix he is the #4 strawweight in the world as of October 2020, and is considered to be one of the best current strawweights.

Mixed martial arts career

Shooto
Ochi began his professional career as a flyweight in Shooto. His first fight came in early 2008, during Shooto: Shooting Disco 4: Born in the Fighting, when he fought the 0-1-2 Masumi Tozawa. Ochi would begin the fight with a left hook knockdown of his opponent, helped by Tozawa being off-balanced. Tozawa would, however, prove to be a better striker in the match-up, landing several well placed kicks and knees. Late in the second minute of the fight, Ochi shot for a takedown, lifted his opponent, and slammed Tozawa, earning a slam knockout victory in his debut, after just three minutes.

Ochi fought again during Shooto: Shooto Tradition 2, with his opponent being the streaking Yuta Nezu. Ochi would implement a pressuring game, and landed a left hook in the third round which staggered Nezu. After following up with a second punch, Nezu's corner threw in the towel. This fight would be followed by Ochi's first professional loss, a unanimous decision against Kosuke Eda.

Looking to bounce back from a loss, Ochi participated in the 2009 Shooto Flyweight Tournament. In the first round he would face the DEEP veteran Seiji Akao, who was likewise coming of from a loss. Ochi would once again pressure his opponent and win by a first-round TKO. A month later Ochi fought Tsuyoshi Okada, winning the fight by an armbar. In the tournament finals, Ochi fought the undefeated Keita Yoshida. After an evenly matched fight, the bout was ruled a majority draw. The judges saw Yoshida as having done more and declared him the tournament winner.

Ochi fought twice in 2010. In his first fight of the year he faced Kono Keita. He suffered his second professional loss, again losing by a unanimous decision. Subsequently, he fought Hiroaki Ijima during Shooto: The Way of Shooto 6: Like a Tiger, Like a Dragon. Ochi won a clear decision, with all three judges awarding him the win.

Ochi fought five more times under the Shooto banner, losing once and winning four times. The most notable fight during this 4–1 run was against Kiyotaka Shimizu. Shimizu was at the time the reigning Pancrase Super Flyweight champion, while Ochi came into the fight riding a four fight winning streak and being the #6 ranked flyweight in Shooto. Ochi won the fight by a majority decision, with two judges scoring the fight in his favor, as Ochi successfully defended Shimizu's takedowns and dominated the striking exchanges.

DEEP
Haruo Ochi's first bout with DEEP was in the co-main slot of the Tokyo Impact event, when he faced Chikara Shimabukuro. The fight was considered a number one contender's bout, with the winner expected to fight Tatsumitsu Wada, who was at the time the DEEP flyweight champion. Ochi secured a first round finish, winning by a guillotine choke.

In his next fight Ochi challenged Tatsumitu Wada for the DEEP Flyweight title during DEEP 64. Wada managed to win a comfortable decision, with all three judges awarding him the victory.

Ochi fought Masakazu Imanari during DEEP 67. During the first round of their matchup Imanari attempted several takedowns, with Ochi managing to defend them and dominate the striking exchanges. Late into the first round, Ochi dropped Imanari with a strike, followed up with ground and pound, and Imanari unsuccessfully attempted a triangle from the bottom. In the second round, Imanari rolled for a heel hook, but Ochi kicked out of it. The referee called for a stop in the action, and the ringside doctor ended the fight, as he suspected that Imanari suffered an orbital fracture.

During DEEP's New Year's Eve event, Dream Impact 2014: Omisoka Special, Ochi fought the former DEEP Bantamweight and Pancrase Featherweight champion Yoshiro Maeda. The majority of the fight was spent in grappling exchanges, with both fighters attempting takedowns, submissions and clinch fighting. Maeda won a majority decision.

Ochi then fought Kota Ishibashi. Ochi relied entirely on out-wrestling Ishibashi, who managed to land several good strikes in between conceding takedowns. The judges ruled the fight a unanimous draw, as Ochi failed to land effective damage on Kota.

In his last career fight at flyweight at that point, Ochi fought Sota Kojima at DEEP Cage Impact 2015 on July 20, 2015. Ochi won the first round through a mixture of body strikes and jab counters. The second round was won by Kojima, who kept distance from Ochi with straight punches and mixing in takedowns, while the third round featured mostly grappling exchanges with Kojima ending the round in back mount. Kojima won a split decision, with two of the three judges scoring 29–28 in his favor.

Move down to strawweight
Following this 0–2–1 run, Ochi would move down to strawweight. His first fight at the weight was against the 0-3 Joo Ho Son, which Ochi won through a second-round TKO.

2015 DEEP Strawweight Grand Prix
In April 2016 it was announced that Ochi would be participating in DEEP's 4-man strawweight tournament that would crown the new strawweight champion. In the semifinal bout he faced Kanta Sato at DEEP 76 on June 26, 2016. He lost the bout via split decision and was eliminated from the tournament.

DEEP Strawweight Champion
Ochi bounced back from this loss with a three fight winning streak over Altantsetseg Uuganbayar, Yutaro Muramoto and Kosuke Suzuki which led him to a chance to fight for the DEEP Strawweight title in a rematch with Kanta Sato. Ochi won the fight by a second round guillotine choke.

Ochi's first title defense was against the former DEEP flyweight title challenger Yuya Shibata at Deep Cage Impact in Osaka on October 8, 2018. Ochi implemented a pressuring game, using his strikes to set up takedowns, winning a unanimous decision and all three rounds of the bout.

Rizin Fighting Federation
In 2018 Haruo Ochi signed a non-exclusive contract with Rizin Fighting Federation. His first fight with the organization was a super fight between Ochi, the DEEP strawweight champion, and Mitsuhisa Sunabe, the prevailing Pancrase Flyweight Champion at Rizin 13 on September 30, 2018. The bout was contested at strawweight. The first two rounds were largely grappling exchanges, with Ochi controlling Sunabe on the ground. In the third round, Ochi managed to knock his opponent down with hooks to the head and body, and followed up with a soccer kick, winning the fight by a third-round TKO.

Moving back to DEEP, Ochi defended his title against Namiki Kawahara at DEEP 88 on March 9, 2019. Ochi won the fight by a unanimous decision.

Ochi would return to Rizin to fight on August 18, 2019, at Rizin 18, facing the former UFC fighter Jarred Brooks. The fight was stopped after only 10 seconds, due to an accidental clash of heads. The pair was rescheduled to fight during Rizin and Bellator MMA cross promotional event, Bellator 237. Brooks implemented his wrestling game, and won a unanimous decision.

Post title reign
Ochi was scheduled to make his third title defense, in a rematch against Namiki Kawahara, during DEEP 96. During the first round of the title defense, Ochi was able to take Kawahara down and briefly control him on the ground, before Kawahara scrambled back to his feet. During the striking exchange that followed, Namiki landed a knee to Ochi's midsection which forced Haruo to fight defensively for the remainder of the round. In the second round Ochi once again shot for a double leg takedown, to which Kawahara responded by moving back to the fence. In the ensuing scramble Kawahara managed to take Ochi's back, and after a failed attempt to slam out of the back control, Kawahara managed to finish Ochi with a rear naked choke.

Ochi returned to mixed martial arts following a 13-month absence from the sport, in his first fight post-title loss, to face Kazuki Shibuya at DEEP 103 Impact on September 23, 2021. Ochi won the fight by unanimous decision, with all three judges awarding him a 29-28 scorecard.

Ochi faced Tatsuya So at Rizin 32 - Okinawa on November 20, 2021. He won the bout via unanimous decision.

Ochi faced Sho Sekihara at DEEP 106 on February 26, 2022, in his third fight at flyweight since moving up in weight. He lost the fight by unanimous decision, with all three judges scoring the bout 29-28 in favor of Sekihara.

2022 DEEP Flyweight Grand Prix
On July 18, 2022, DEEP announced that Ochi is participating the promotion's 16-man Flyweight Grand Prix and is scheduled to face Ryosuke Honda in the first round taking place at DEEP 109 on August 21, 2022. He lost the bout via split decision.

Ochi faced Masato Nakamura at DEEP 111 Impact on December 11, 2022, winning the bout via first round guillotine choke.

Championship and accomplishments
DEEP
DEEP Strawweight World Championship (One time; former)
Two successful title defenses
Fight Matrix
Strawweight Lineal Championship (One time; former)

Mixed martial arts record
 

|-
|Win
|align=center|22–11–2 (1)
| Masato Nakamura
| Submission (guillotine choke)
| DEEP 111 Impact
| 
| align=center|1
| align=center|2:31
| Tokyo, Japan
| 
|-
| Loss
| align=center|21–11–2 (1)
| Ryosuke Honda
| Decision (split)
| DEEP 109 Impact
| 
| align=center|3
| align=center|5:00
| Tokyo, Japan
| 
|-
| Loss
| align=center|21–10–2 (1)
| Sho Sekihara
| Decision (unanimous)
| DEEP 106 Impact
| 
| align=center| 3
| align=center| 5:00
| Tokyo, Japan
| 
|-
|Win
|align=center|21–9–2 (1)
|Tatsuya So
|Decision (unanimous)
|Rizin 32
|
|align=center|3
|align=center|5:00
|Okinawa, Japan
|
|-
|Win
|align=center|20–9–2 (1)
|Kazuki Shibuya
|Decision (unanimous)
|DEEP 103 Impact
|
|align=center|3
|align=center|5:00
|Tokyo, Japan
|
|-
|Loss
|align=center|19–9–2 (1)
|Namiki Kawahara
|Technical Submission (rear-naked choke)
|DEEP 96
|
|align=center|2
|align=center|4:43
|Tokyo, Japan
||
|-
|Loss
|align=center|19–8–2 (1)
|Jarred Brooks
|Decision (unanimous)
|Bellator 237
|
|align=center|3
|align=center|5:00
|Saitama, Japan
|
|-
|NC
|align=center|19–7–2 (1)
|Jarred Brooks
|No Contest (accidental headbutt)
|Rizin 18
|
|align=center|1
|align=center|0:10
|Nagoya, Japan
|
|-
|Win
|align=center|19–7–2
|Namiki Kawahara
|Decision (unanimous)
|Deep - 88 Impact
|
|align=center|3
|align=center|5:00
|Tokyo, Japan
|
|-
|Win
|align=center|18–7–2
|Mitsuhisa Sunabe
|KO (punch and soccer kicks)
|Rizin 13
|
|align=center|3
|align=center|2:53
|Saitama, Japan
|
|-
|Win
|align=center|17–7–2
|Yuya Shibata
|Decision (unanimous)
|Deep - Cage Impact 2018 in Osaka
|
|align=center|3
|align=center|5:00
|Osaka, Japan
|
|-
|Win
|align=center|16–7–2
|Kanta Sato
|Submission (guillotine choke)
|Deep - 79 Impact
|
|align=center|2
|align=center|N/A
|Tokyo, Japan
|
|-
|Win
|align=center|15–7–2
|Kosuke Suzuki
|Decision (unanimous)
|Deep - Cage Impact 2017
|
|align=center|3
|align=center|5:00
|Tokyo, Japan
|
|-
|Win
|align=center|14–7–2
|Yutaro Muramoto
|Submission (guillotine choke)
|Deep - Cage Impact 2016: Deep vs. WSOF-GC
|
|align=center|2
|align=center|3:46
|Tokyo, Japan
|
|-
|Win
|align=center|13–7–2
|Altantsetseg Uuganbayar
|Decision (unanimous)
|MGL-1 Fighting Championship - MGL-1 vs. Deep
|
|align=center|3
|align=center|5:00
|Ulaanbaatar, Mongolia
|
|-
|Loss
|align=center|12–7–2
|Kanta Sato
|Decision (split)
|Deep - 76 Impact
|
|align=center|3
|align=center|5:00
|Tokyo, Japan
|
|-
|Win
|align=center|12–6–2
|Joo Ho Son
|TKO (punches)
|Deep - 74 Impact
|
|align=center|2
|align=center|2:37
|Tokyo, Japan
|
|-
|Loss
|align=center|11–6–2
|Sota Kojima
|Decision (split)
|Deep - Cage Impact 2015
|
|align=center|3
|align=center|5:00
|Tokyo, Japan
|
|-
|Draw
|align=center|11–5–2
|Kota Ishibashi
|Draw (unanimous)
|Deep - 71 Impact
|
|align=center|2
|align=center|5:00
|Tokyo, Japan
|
|-
|Loss
|align=center|11–5–1
|Yoshiro Maeda
|Decision (majority)
|Deep - Dream Impact 2014: Omisoka Special
|
|align=center|3
|align=center|5:00
|Saitama, Japan
|
|-
|Win
|align=center|11–4–1
|Masakazu Imanari
|TKO (doctor stoppage)
|Deep - 67 Impact
|
|align=center|2
|align=center|0:51
|Tokyo, Japan
|
|-
|Loss
|align=center|10–4–1
|Tatsumitsu Wada
|Decision (unanimous)
|Deep - 64 Impact
|
|align=center|3
|align=center|5:00
|Tokyo, Japan
|
|-
|Win
|align=center|10–3–1
|Chikara Shimabukuro
|Submission (guillotine choke)
|Deep - Tokyo Impact: Wave 6
|
|align=center|1
|align=center|4:40
|Tokyo, Japan
|
|-
|Loss
|align=center|9–3–1
|Ryuichi Miki
|Decision (unanimous)
|Shooto - 12th Round
|
|align=center|3
|align=center|5:00
|Tokyo, Japan
|
|-
|Win
|align=center|9–2–1
|Kiyotaka Shimizu
|Decision (majority)
|Shooto - 3rd Round
|
|align=center|3
|align=center|5:00
|Tokyo, Japan
|
|-
|Win
|align=center|8–2–1
|Masaaki Sugawara
|TKO (punches)
|Shooto - Survivor Tournament Final
|
|align=center|1
|align=center|1:02
|Tokyo, Japan
|
|-
|Win
|align=center|7–2–1
|Ryuichi Miki
|Decision (split)
|Shooto: Shootor's Legacy 4
|
|align=center|2
|align=center|5:00
|Tokyo, Japan
|
|-
|Win
|align=center|6–2–1
|Kosuke Suzuki
|KO (punch)
|Shooto: Gig Tokyo 6
|
|align=center|2
|align=center|2:10
|Tokyo, Japan
|
|-
|Win
|align=center|5–2–1
|Hiroaki Ijima
|Decision (unanimous)
|Shooto: The Way of Shooto 6: Like a Tiger, Like a Dragon
|
|align=center|2
|align=center|5:00
|Tokyo, Japan
|
|-
|Loss
|align=center|4–2–1
|Keita Kono
|Decision (unanimous)
|Shooto: Shooting Disco 11: Tora Tora Tora!
|
|align=center|2
|align=center|5:00
|Tokyo, Japan
|
|-
|Draw
|align=center|4–1–1
|Keita Yoshida
|Draw (majority)
|Shooto: The Rookie Tournament 2009 Final
|
|align=center|3
|align=center|5:00
|Tokyo, Japan
|
|-
|Win
|align=center|4–1
|Tsuyoshi Okada
|Technical Submission (armbar)
|Shooto: Grapplingman 8
|
|align=center|1
|align=center|2:16
|Tokyo, Japan
|
|-
|Win
|align=center|3–1
|Seiji Akao
|TKO (corner stoppage)
|Shooto: Gig Tokyo 2
|
|align=center|1
|align=center|2:18
|Tokyo, Japan
|
|-
|Loss
|align=center|2–1
|Kosuke Eda
|Decision (unanimous)
|Shooto: Shooting Disco 6: Glory Shines In You
|
|align=center|2
|align=center|5:00
|Tokyo, Japan
|
|-
|Win
|align=center|2–0
|Yuta Nezu
|Submission (bulldog choke)
|Shooto: Shooto Tradition 2
|
|align=center|1
|align=center|3:42
|Tokyo, Japan
|
|-
|Win
|align=center|1–0
|Masumi Tozawa
|KO (slam)
|Shooto: Shooting Disco 4: Born in the Fighting
|
|align=center|1
|align=center|3:11
|Tokyo, Japan
|

See also
 List of male mixed martial artists

References

External links

1984 births
Living people
Japanese male mixed martial artists
Mixed martial artists utilizing boxing
Mixed martial artists utilizing karate
Japanese male karateka
People from Saijō, Ehime
Sportspeople from Ehime Prefecture